Neil Michael Hagerty (born 1965) is an American guitarist, songwriter and producer. He is best known for his work in Royal Trux which he formed with his partner Jennifer Herrema, with whom he lived in Washington, Virginia.

Hagerty released several solo albums since Royal Trux's demise in 2001, followed by recordings under the moniker The Howling Hex. He also performed as a guitarist and songwriter in Pussy Galore and Weird War. Hagerty is the author of two books, Victory Chimp (1997), a science fiction novel, and Public Works (2005), a collection of short essays.

Discography
Neil Michael Hagerty CD, LP (2001)
Plays That Good Old Rock and Roll CD, LP (2002)
Neil Michael Hagerty & the Howling Hex CD, LP (2003)

References

External links
 Drag City discography
 Howling Hex site

Noise rock musicians
Living people
Pussy Galore (band) members
Place of birth missing (living people)
Drag City (record label) artists
Weird War members
People from Washington, Virginia
American male guitarists
1965 births
American male singer-songwriters